Wayne Edward Engelstad (born December 6, 1965) is a retired American professional basketball player. Born in Rosemead, California, he was a 6'8" (2.03 cm) 245 lb (111 kg) forward and played collegiately at the University of California, Irvine.

He played for the Denver Nuggets for 11 games in 1988–89, averaging 2.5 points and 1.5 rebounds per contest. He also played in Portugal and with the Hobart Tassie Devils in the Australian NBL in 1991, averaging 18 points per game in 24 contests.

Engelstad's daughter Sabrina played in the 2013–2014 season at Saint Mary's before transferring to UC Irvine for the 2016–2017 and 2017–2018 seasons.

See also
Don Bosco Technical Institute

External links
NBA stats @ basketballreference.com

References

1965 births
Living people
Albany Patroons players
American expatriate basketball people in Argentina
American expatriate basketball people in Australia
American expatriate basketball people in Portugal
American expatriate basketball people in Spain
American men's basketball players
Basketball players from California
Denver Nuggets players
Don Bosco Technical Institute alumni
Estudiantes de Bahía Blanca basketball players
FC Porto basketball players
Hobart Devils players
La Crosse Catbirds players
Liga ACB players
People from Rosemead, California
Power forwards (basketball)
Rapid City Thrillers players
UC Irvine Anteaters men's basketball players
Undrafted National Basketball Association players
Valencia Basket players